HMS Battle was a Hunt class minesweeper of the Royal Navy from World War I. She was cancelled and launched incomplete.

See also
 Battle, East Sussex

References
 

 

Hunt-class minesweepers (1916)
Royal Navy ship names
Ships built in Dundee
1919 ships